The  is a series of semi-automatic pistols designed by Shin-Chuō Industries, later merged with Minebea. "New Nambu" was named after Kijirō Nambu, a notable firearm designer and the founder of Shin-Chuō Industries.

History 
In the Empire of Japan, there were many semi-automatic pistols such as Nambu pistols designed by Kijirō Nambu, but after the Surrender of Japan, firearms development had all ceased. So law enforcement officers and military personnel of Japan Self-Defense Forces (JSDF) were equipped with American-made firearms. With the policy of protecting industrial growth, the Ministry of International Trade and Industry (MITI) had been oriented to domestic production of service firearms.

In 1957, the development was started by Shin-Chuō Industries under the leadership of the MITI. The development of three handguns had been promoted at the same time in parallel. Semi-automatic pistols were completed as New Nambu M57, and the revolver became New Nambu M60.

Development was completed in 1958, but never entered service because of problems of interoperability between the JSDF and the United States Armed Forces. In the 1970s, the JSDF restarted the trial for 9mm caliber pistols in conjunction with the United States. Minebea, the successor of Shin-Chuō Industries, developed a modified version of the M57A for the trial and contract. This version was completed as M57A1, but the JSDF selected the SIG Sauer P220 instead.

Small number of M57As and Bs were purchased in order to maintain production capacity and experience in manufacturing small arms in Japan, but they were never issued to the JSDF nor to any law enforcement agency.

Variants
The M57A is a large combat pistol for the JSDF and Maritime Safety Agency (JMSA), which was a 9×19mm Parabellum caliber version of the American M1911A1, in essence. The M1911A1 was the standard service pistol of the JSDF, but its recoil was too strong for small-hand people such as average Japanese people, so small-caliber version was required.

The M57A1 was an improved version of the M57A in an attempt to get it accepted into the JSDF as an official sidearm, which lost to the SIG-Sauer P220 in 1982.

The M57B is a compact semi-automatic pistol for railroad police and airport police, based on the FN Model 1910; firing mechanism is changed from striker to hammer-based.

Notes

References

Bibliography
 
 
 

Infantry weapons of the Cold War
Cold War weapons of Japan
Semi-automatic pistols of Japan
9mm Parabellum semi-automatic pistols
.32 ACP semi-automatic pistols
7.65mm firearms